Culinard was a culinary school owned by Education Corporation of America.  It was opened in 2000 as part of the Birmingham, Alabama branch of Virginia College.  The second campus was opened with the establishment of the Jacksonville, Florida branch of Virginia College in  2009. Additional Culinard campuses operated at Virginia College campuses in Mobile, Alabama; Richmond, Virginia; Chattanooga, Tennessee, and Savannah, Georgia. This school shut down in December 2018 because Educational Corporation of America shut down.

Culinard offered two 36-week educational programs: a Culinary Arts Diploma and a Pastry Arts Diploma. An online Culinary Arts associate degree is also available if certain criteria are met e.g. having already had formal training in culinary skills at a post-secondary level.

Teaching faculty
The school's Culinary Dean is Chef Antony Osborne, a European Master Pastry Chef with educational degrees earned and experience training with culinary institutes such as Westminster College and the Ealing College of London, Slough Polytechnic University in England and Sullivan University in Kentucky. Osborne is a recipient of the Golden Lion Award, the highest culinary award in Asia, and was named one of the Top Ten Pastry Chefs in the United States in 2006.

Twenty-nine other Culinary and Pastry chef instructors at Culinard contribute a variety of international experience, cultural diversity and professional expertise to the teaching curriculum. They have received local and international awards and participated in several TV episodes of Food Network’s “Unwrapped,” “Dining Around,” "Sugar Inventions Challenge” and programs on the DIY Network.

Faculty member Chef Daniel Navarro won an American Culinary Federation competition that rewarded him with an opportunity to train in France at the Bocuse Institute for a year.

Chef instructor Mary Schaefer has a website with her husband called yourallergychefs.com that addresses the issue of cooking for people with food allergies.

Awards
Culinard was named among the nation's best culinary programs in 2011 by Chef2chef a culinary web portal.

Restaurants
Culinard operated four public restaurants that are teaching establishments for the staff of professional chefs to provide a learning lab environment for the culinary and pastry arts students. The Café at Cahaba Grand is located in the Cahaba Grand Conference Center in Birmingham, Alabama and used to offer a full hot breakfast and lunch daily. The Café at Innovation Depot is a 3,700-square-foot European-style bakery that was open to the public and featured baked goods, gelato and catering services.  Century Restaurant and Bar is located in the 98-year-old Tutwiler Hotel in Birmingham, Alabama. Kitchen on George, located in the Oakleigh Historic District of Mobile, Alabama, offered fresh, contemporary American food in a casual atmosphere.

Accreditation
Culinard is a college formerly accredited by the ACICS and its programs are accredited by the American Culinary Federation.

Notable alumni
Dr. Luis Pineda, an oncology/hematology physician in Birmingham, Alabama. Pineda is the author of Prescription to Taste: A Cooking Guide for Cancer Patients. He also conducts "Cooking with Cancer" programs at various venues across the U.S.
Chef Guy Rogers of The Colony of the Grand Hotel Marriott Resort in Point Clear, Alabama; Chef Eric Helfinstine with 7 Place Café in Clanton, Alabama; Daniel Millsap of Bistro Aix in Jacksonville, Florida; and Executive Chef Carl Tilley of Kitchen on George, Mobile, AL who is the 2014 Lagniappe Magazine Best Chef.

References

External links
 

Cooking schools in the United States
United Hotels Company of America
Educational institutions disestablished in 2018
Defunct private universities and colleges in Alabama